HD 1, also known as HIP 422, is the first star catalogued in the Henry Draper Catalogue. It is located in the northern circumpolar constellation Cephus and has an apparent magnitude of 7.42, making it readily visible in binoculars, but not to the naked eye.

Characteristics
Originally thought to be a single object, observations from Griffin & McClure (2009) reveal it to be  a single-lined spectroscopic binary. The components take approximately 6 years to circle each other in an eccentric orbit. The visible component is an evolved red giant branch (RGB) star with a stellar classification of G9-K0 IIIa, a spectral class intermediate between a G9 and K0 giant star. It has 3 times the mass of the Sun, but at the age of 350 million years it has expanded to 30 times its girth. HD 1 A is metal enriched, with an iron abundance 74% above solar levels.

References 

Spectroscopic binaries
1
000422
K-type giants
G-type giants
Cepheus (constellation)
BD+67 01599